St Patrick's Roman Catholic Church Cemetery is a heritage-listed Roman Catholic cemetery at Queen Street, Singleton, Singleton Council, New South Wales, Australia. It was added to the New South Wales State Heritage Register on 2 April 1999.

History 

The cemetery, which adjoins St Patrick's Catholic Church, was first established in 1842. The first recorded burial was in 1844, and the cemetery was consecrated by Anglican Archbishop of Sydney, Bede Polding in 1845.

A Wesleyan (Methodist) section was established in the 1860s. Two stone towers were added to the entry in 1920.

A columbarium was established  early 1980s, with plaques dating from 1982.

Description

The cemetery contains approximately 500 burials and 400 monuments. It continues to have Catholic and Methodist sections.

Heritage listing 
St Patrick's Roman Catholic Church Cemetery was listed on the New South Wales State Heritage Register on 2 April 1999.

See also 

 List of cemeteries in New South Wales
 Roman Catholic Church in Australia

References

Attribution

External links
 

Singleton
Singleton, New South Wales
Cemeteries in New South Wales
Articles incorporating text from the New South Wales State Heritage Register